Clarence Thomas Jones (born May 6, 1968) is a former American football offensive tackle in the National Football League. He was drafted by the New York Giants in the fourth round of the 1991 NFL Draft. He played college football at Maryland.  Jones also played for the Los Angeles / St. Louis Rams, New Orleans Saints, and Carolina Panthers.

References

1968 births
Living people
American football offensive tackles
Carolina Panthers players
Los Angeles Rams players
Maryland Terrapins football players
New Orleans Saints players
New York Giants players
St. Louis Rams players
People from Central Islip, New York
Sportspeople from Brooklyn
Players of American football from New York City
Sportspeople from Suffolk County, New York